is a Japanese autodidact architect whose approach to architecture and landscape was categorized by architectural historian Francesco Dal Co as "critical regionalism". He is the winner of the 1995 Pritzker Prize.

Early life
Ando was born a few minutes before his twin brother in 1941 in Minato-ku, Osaka, Japan. At the age of two, his family chose to separate them and have Tadao live with his great grandmother. He worked as a boxer and fighter before settling on the profession of architect, despite never having formal training in the field. Struck by the Frank Lloyd Wright-designed Imperial Hotel on a trip to Tokyo as a second-year high school student, he eventually decided to end his boxing career less than two years after graduating from high school to pursue architecture. He attended night classes to learn drawing and took correspondence courses on interior design. He visited buildings designed by renowned architects like Le Corbusier, Ludwig Mies van der Rohe, Frank Lloyd Wright, and Louis Kahn before returning to Osaka in 1968 to establish his own design studio, Tadao Ando Architects and Associates.

Career

Style

Ando was raised in Japan where the religion and style of life strongly influenced his architecture and design. Ando's architectural style is said to create a "haiku" effect, emphasizing nothingness and empty space to represent the beauty of simplicity. He favors designing complex spatial circulation while maintaining the appearance of simplicity. A self-taught architect, he keeps his Japanese culture and language in mind while he travels around Europe for research. As an architect, he believes that architecture can change society, that "to change the dwelling is to change the city and to reform society". "Reform society" could be a promotion of a place or a change of the identity of that place. Werner Blaser has said, "Good buildings by Tadao Ando create memorable identity and therefore publicity, which in turn attracts the public and promotes market penetration".

The simplicity of his architecture emphasizes the concept of sensation and physical experiences, mainly influenced by Japanese culture. The religious term Zen, focuses on the concept of simplicity and concentrates on inner feeling rather than outward appearance. Zen influences vividly show in Ando's work and became its distinguishing mark. In order to practice the idea of simplicity, Ando's architecture is mostly constructed with concrete, providing a sense of cleanliness and weightlessness (even though concrete is a heavy material) at the same time. Due to the simplicity of the exterior, construction, and organization of the space are relatively potential in order to represent the aesthetic of sensation.

Besides Japanese religious architecture, Ando has also designed Christian churches, such as the Church of the Light (1989) and the Church in Tarumi (1993). Although Japanese and Christian churches display distinct characteristics, Ando treats them in a similar way. He believes there should be no difference in designing religious architecture and houses. As he explains,

We do not need to differentiate one from the other. Dwelling in a house is not only a functional issue, but also a spiritual one. The house is the locus of heart (kokoro), and the heart is the locus of god. Dwelling in a house is a search for the heart (kokoro) as the locus of god, just as one goes to church to search for god. An important role of the church is to enhance this sense of the spiritual. In a spiritual place, people find peace in their heart (kokoro), as in their homeland.

Besides speaking of the spirit of architecture, Ando also emphasises the association between nature and architecture. He intends for people to easily experience the spirit and beauty of nature through architecture. He believes architecture is responsible for performing the attitude of the site and makes it visible. This not only represents his theory of the role of architecture in society but also shows why he spends so much time studying architecture from physical experience.

In 1995, Ando won the Pritzker Prize for architecture, considered the highest distinction in the field. He donated the $100,000 prize money to the orphans of the 1995 Kobe earthquake.

Buildings and works

Tadao Ando's body of work is known for the creative use of natural light and for structures that follow natural forms of the landscape, rather than disturbing the landscape by making it conform to the constructed space of a building. Ando's buildings are often characterized by complex three-dimensional circulation paths. These paths weave in between interior and exterior spaces formed both inside large-scale geometric shapes and in the spaces between them.

His "Row House in Sumiyoshi" (Azuma House, 住吉の長屋), a small two-story, cast-in-place concrete house completed in 1976, is an early work which began to show elements of his characteristic style. It consists of three equal rectangular volumes: two enclosed volumes of interior spaces separated by an open courtyard. The courtyard's position between the two interior volumes becomes an integral part of the house's circulation system. The house is famous for the contrast between appearance and spatial organization which allow people to experience the richness of the space within the geometry.

Ando's housing complex at Rokko, just outside Kobe, is a complex warren of terraces and balconies, atriums and shafts. The designs for Rokko Housing One (1983) and for Rokko Housing Two (1993) illustrate a range of issues in traditional architectural vocabulary—the interplay of solid and void, the alternatives of open and closed, the contrasts of light and darkness. More significantly, Ando's noteworthy engineering achievement in these clustered buildings is site specific—the structures survived undamaged after the Great Hanshin earthquake of 1995. New York Times architectural critic Paul Goldberger argues that:

Ando is right in the Japanese tradition: spareness has always been a part of Japanese architecture, at least since the 16th century; [and] it is not without reason that Frank Lloyd Wright more freely admitted to the influences of Japanese architecture than of anything American."

Like Wright's Imperial Hotel in Tokyo Second Imperial Hotel 1923-1968, which did survive the Great Kantō earthquake of 1923, site specific decision-making, anticipates seismic activity in several of Ando's Hyōgo-Awaji buildings.

Projects

Awards

References

Literature
Francesco Dal Co. Tadao Ando: Complete Works. Phaidon Press, 1997. 
Kenneth Frampton. Tadao Ando: Buildings, Projects, Writings. Rizzoli International Publications, 1984. 
Randall J. Van Vynckt. International Dictionary of Architects and Architecture. St. James Press, 1993. 
Masao Furuyama. “Tadao Ando”. Taschen, 2006. 
Werner Blaser, “Tadao Ando, Architecktur der Stille, Architecture of silence” Birkhäuser, 2001. 
Jin Baek, “Nothingness: Tadao Ando’s Christian Sacred Space”. Routledge, 2009.

External links

Tadao Ando official website 
Architect Tadao Ando projects
Tadao Ando page at greatbuildingsonline.com
Architectural Record Magazine | Interviews | Tadao Ando

1941 births
Living people
People from Osaka

20th-century Japanese architects
21st-century Japanese architects
Kyoto laureates in Arts and Philosophy
Pritzker Architecture Prize winners
Osaka University of Arts alumni
Academic staff of the University of Tokyo
Columbia University faculty
Recipients of the Royal Gold Medal
Recipients of the Order of Culture
Recipients of the Praemium Imperiale
Members of the Académie d'architecture
Commandeurs of the Ordre des Arts et des Lettres
Japanese male boxers
Honorary Members of the Royal Academy
Recipients of the Legion of Honour
Recipients of the AIA Gold Medal
Domus (magazine) editors